Brenn Hill (born May 26, 1976 in Ogden, Utah) is an American Western music singer-songwriter specialising in country and cowboy music.. He won the Western Music Association Crescendo Award in 2001 and was named the 2004 Academy of Western Artists Male Vocalist of the Year.

Early career 

Brenn Hill self-released two albums, Rangefire in 1997 and Deeper Than Mud in 1999. In 2000 his third album, Trail Through Yesterday, was released by the Real West Productions record label. The album was produced by cowboy and Western musician Ian Tyson. 2001 saw the release of Hill's Call You Cowboy, an "authentic country" that was praised by Allmusic as "clearly can't be mistaken for another cookie-cutter, neo-traditional Nashville pretty boy." The album won the Western Music Association's Crescendo Award, awarded to the year's biggest rising star in the genre.

Red Cliffs Press

Endangered (2004) 

In 2004 Hill released Endangered on his own record label, Red Cliffs Press. The album featured the top 20 Texas music chart hits "Buckaroo Tattoo" and "Pickup Truck Cafe", and was praised in American Cowboy magazine as "A collection of 14 songs with a fuller sound, more intricate arrangements, higher production values, and just a more individualistic stamp on it than Hill's previous work." Produced by Eddie Schwartz and recorded at Ocean Way studios in Nashville, Endangered won the Academy of Western Artists Male Vocalist of the Year Award, and was nominated for Album of the Year and Song of the Year for "Buckaroo Tattoo".

What A Man's Got To Do (2007) 

In 2007 Hill returned to Nashville to record his sixth album, the first he produced himself, What A Man's Got To Do, at Beaird Music Group studios. American Cowboy magazine commenting that "this latest effort looks to be his best ever... What you have to like about Brenn Hill is his honesty and his devotion to the West. He is skilled as a lyricist as well as a composer." Western Horseman magazine said that "Hill isn't content pigeon-holing his music as cowboy or country. It's simply his music – a blend of classic and contemporary."

Discography

Albums 
 2018 Rocky Mountain Drifter
 2016 How You Heal
 2015 Spirit Rider
 2013 Ode to Selway
 2011 North Pole Rodeo
 2011 Rodeo Heaven
 2010 Equine
 2007 What A Man's Got To Do
 2004 Endangered
 2001 Call You Cowboy
 2000 Trail Through Yesterday
 1999 Deeper Than Mud
 1997 Rangefire

References

External links 
 
 Brenn Hill's official MySpace profile
 Allmusic

1976 births
American country guitarists
American country singer-songwriters
American folk guitarists
American male guitarists
American folk singers
Living people
Musicians from Ogden, Utah
Country musicians from Utah
Guitarists from Utah
21st-century American male singers
21st-century American singers
21st-century American guitarists
American male singer-songwriters
Singer-songwriters from Utah